Zhukovka is a rural locality (a selo) in Pavlozavodsky Selsoviet, Pavlovsky District, Altai Krai, Russia. The population was 278 as of 2013. There are 3 streets.

Geography 
Zhukovka is located 19 km south of Pavlovsk (the district's administrative centre) by road. Ozyorny is the nearest rural locality.

References 

Rural localities in Pavlovsky District, Altai Krai